Arthrobacter gandavensis is a Gram-positive bacterium species from the genus Arthrobacter which has been isolated from mastitic milk in Belgium.

References

Further reading

External links
Type strain of Arthrobacter gandavensis at BacDive -  the Bacterial Diversity Metadatabase

Bacteria described in 2003
Micrococcaceae